The secretary of state for education, also referred to as the education secretary, is a secretary of state in the Government of the United Kingdom, responsible for the work of the Department for Education. The incumbent is a member of the Cabinet of the United Kingdom.

The office holder works alongside the other Education ministers. The corresponding shadow minister is the Shadow Secretary of State for Education, and the work of the Secretary of State is also scrutinised by the Education Select Committee.

The current education secretary is Gillian Keegan.

Responsibilities
Corresponding to what is generally known as an education minister in many other countries, the education secretary's remit is concerned primarily with England. This includes:

 Early years
 Children's social care
 Teacher recruitment and retention
 The national curriculum
 School improvement
 Academies and free schools
 Further education
 Apprenticeships and skills
 Higher education
 Oversight of the departmental coronavirus (COVID-19) response
 Oversight of school infrastructure improvement

History
A committee of the Privy Council was appointed in 1839 to supervise the distribution of certain government grants in the education field. The members of the committee were the Lord President of the Council, the Secretaries of State, the First Lord of the Treasury, and the Chancellor of the Exchequer. From 1857 a vice-president was appointed who took responsibility for policy.

On 1 April 1900, the Board of Education Act 1899 abolished the committee and instituted a new board, headed by a president. The members were initially very similar to the old committee and the president of the board was the Lord President of the council; however, from 1902 this ceased to be the case and the president of the board was appointed separately (although the Marquess of Londonderry happened to hold both jobs from 1903 to 1905).

The Education Act 1944 replaced the Board of Education with a new Ministry of Education.

The position of Secretary of State for Education and Science was created in 1964 with the merger of the offices of Minister of Education and the Minister of Science. The postholder oversaw the Department of Education and Science.

From June 1970 to March 1974, this post was held by future prime minister Margaret Thatcher.

In 1992, the responsibility for science was transferred to Cabinet Office's Office of Public Service, and the department was renamed Department of Education. In 1995 the department merged with the Department of Employment to become the Department for Education and Employment (DfEE) and in 2001 the employment functions were transferred to a newly created Department for Work and Pensions, with the DfEE becoming the Department for Education and Skills (DfES). In 2007 under Gordon Brown's new premiership, the DfES was split into two new departments; the Department for Children, Schools and Families, and a Department for Innovation, Universities and Skills, under two new secretaries of state.

The ministerial office of the Secretary of State for Innovation, Universities and Skills was, in late 2009, amalgamated into the new ministerial office of the resurgent politician Peter Mandelson, made a peer and given the title Lord Mandelson as the newly created Secretary of State for Business, Innovation and Skills – itself an amalgamation of the responsibilities of the Secretaries of State for Business, Enterprise and Regulatory Reform and Innovation, Universities and Skills.  The Secretary of State has remit over higher education policy as well as British business and enterprise.

From 14 July 2016 to 8 January 2018 the post was held by Justine Greening, as her predecessor, Nicky Morgan, was sacked by Theresa May. Greening resigned after rejecting a reshuffle to the Department for Work and Pensions.  

On 7 July 2022, Michelle Donelan became the shortest-serving cabinet member in British history, when she resigned as Education Secretary 35 hours after being appointed.

List of office holders

Vice-President of the Committee of the Council on Education (1857–1902)
Colour key (for political parties):

President of the Board of Education (1900–1944)
Colour key (for political parties):

Minister of Education (1944–1964)
Colour key (for political parties):

Secretary of State for Education and Science (1964–1992)
Colour key (for political parties):

Secretary of State for Education (1992–1995)
Colour key (for political parties):

Secretary of State for Education and Employment (1995–2001)
Colour key (for political parties):

Secretary of State for Education and Skills (2001–2007)
Colour key (for political parties):

Secretaries of State for Children, Schools and Families (2007–2010); and Innovation, Universities and Skills (2007–2009)
In 2007, the education portfolio was divided between the Department for Children, Schools and Families (responsible for infant, primary and secondary education) and the Department for Innovation, Universities and Skills (responsible for further, higher and adult education). In 2009, the latter department was merged into the Department for Business, Innovation and Skills.

Secretary of State for Children, Schools and Families

Secretary of State for Innovation, Universities and Skills

Secretary of State for Education (2010–present)
The Department for Education and the post of Secretary of State for Education were recreated in 2010.

Responsibility for higher and adult education remained with the Secretary of State for Business, Innovation and Skills (Vince Cable 2010–2015, Sajid Javid 2015–2016), until reunited with the Department for Education in 2016.

Colour key (for political parties):

* Incumbent's length of term last updated: .

References

External links

 Department for Education
 Department for Business, Innovation and Skills (BIS)

Education and Skills
Education in the United Kingdom
Department for Education
Ministerial offices in the United Kingdom